Walkiria Terradura (born 9 January 1924) is an Italian anti-fascist partisan who was awarded the Silver Medal of Military Valour.

Biography 
One of five children of committed antifascist lawyer Gustavo Terradura and his wife Laura, Terradura witnessed her father's harassment and imprisonment several times during her youth. Her contemptuous attitude towards the fascist regime earned her repeated admonishments at school and interrogations at the police headquarters.

Following school, Terradura studied law at the University of Perugia. In January 1944, when agents of the OVRA raided her home looking to arrest her father, she hid him and they subsequently fled to the Monti del Burano to join partisan formations in that area.

They joined the Garibaldi Brigades operating in the province of Pesaro Urbino, specifically the fifth battalion, under commander Samuele Panichi. Her sister Lionella joined the same group.  The only woman in a squad of six that took the name Settebello, Terradura was voted squad leader. Terradura specialized in mines and explosives, undertaking operations to destroy bridges to hinder the movements of the German Nazi and Italian fascist armies. There were eight different arrest warrants against her, but she was never captured.

During the war Terradura met a captain of the Office of Strategic Services, Alfonso Thiele, whom she married and briefly lived with in the United States after the war, before returning to Italy. She remained active in politics and in the veterans' organisation, the National Association of Italian Partisans.

Award
By Presidential decree on 26 June 1970, Terradura's citation for military valour notes:

References 

1924 births
Living people

People from Gubbio
Italian anti-fascists
Italian partisans
Female resistance members of World War II
Women in war in Italy
20th-century Italian women
Female anti-fascists
Racing drivers' wives and girlfriends